Izutsu is a classic Noh play written by Zeami

It may also refer to:
Izutsu stable, a former sumo wrestling stable
Kenzo Izutsu (born 1941), Japanese former swimmer
Rikuya Izutsu (born 1994), Japanese former footballer
Toshihiko Izutsu (1914–1993), Japanese philosopher and religionist